Herbert Knott (5 December 1914 – June 1986) was an English professional footballer who played in the Football League for Walsall and Hull City as an inside forward.

Career statistics

Honours 
Margate

 Kent League First Division: 1946–47

References

English footballers
English Football League players

Lincoln City F.C. wartime guest players
Sheffield United F.C. wartime guest players
Hull City A.F.C. wartime guest players
Reading F.C. wartime guest players
Norwich City F.C. wartime guest players
Notts County F.C. wartime guest players
Millwall F.C. wartime guest players
Clapton Orient F.C. wartime guest players
1914 births
1986 deaths
People from Goole
Association football inside forwards
Goole Town F.C. players
Arsenal F.C. players
Hendon F.C. players
Margate F.C. players
Brentford F.C. players
Stourbridge F.C. players
Walsall F.C. players
Brierley Hill Alliance F.C. players
Hull City A.F.C. players
Bradford (Park Avenue) A.F.C. players
Hinckley Athletic F.C. players
Kent Football League (1894–1959) players